Lieutenant-General Dudley Charles FitzGerald-de Ros, 23rd Baron de Ros of Helmsley,  (11 March 1827 – 29 April 1907) was a soldier, courtier and the premier Baron of England.

Biography
He was the son of William FitzGerald-de Ros and Lady Georgiana Lennox. He was born in Brighton.

He purchased a commission as cornet and sub-lieutenant in the 1st Life Guards on 7 February 1845, succeeding Viscount Seaham, and a lieutenancy on 5 May 1848 when Seaham retired. He purchased a captaincy on 31 October 1851, succeeding Thomas Myddelton Biddulph, and on 30 August 1859, he purchased a commission as major and lieutenant-colonel upon the retirement of James Hogg. He was breveted colonel on 30 August 1864. FitzGerald-de Ros retired on half-pay on 29 May 1872.

The 24th Baron was Equerry to the Prince Consort from 1853 to 1861, and then to Queen Victoria from 1861 to 1874. He was also a Conservative Party Lord in Waiting from 1874 to 1880, 1885–1886, and 1886–1892.

Lord de Ros was appointed a Knight of the Order of St Patrick (KP) in the 1902 Coronation Honours list published on 26 June 1902, and was invested by the Lord Lieutenant of Ireland, Earl Cadogan, at Dublin Castle on 11 August 1902.

He was appointed Colonel of the 1st Life Guards on 17 November 1902.

Family
He married firstly to Lady Elizabeth Egerton (5 July 1832 – 14 March 1892), daughter of Thomas Egerton, 2nd Earl of Wilton, in Heaton, Lancashire, on 12 October 1853, then to Mary Geraldine Mahon (died 28 December 1921), daughter of Sir William Mahon, 4th Baronet, in London on 14 January 1896. By his first wife, he had one daughter: 
Mary FitzGerald-de Ros (born 1854), who succeeded her father upon his death.
The 23rd Baron had no children by his second wife. He died in Old Court, County Down.

References

 "de Ros, Baron (Maxwell) (Baron E 1264)." Debrett's Peerage & Baronetage 1995. London: Debrett's Peerage Limited, 1995. pp. 362–363.

24
Dudley
1827 births
1907 deaths
British Army lieutenant generals
British Life Guards officers
Knights of St Patrick
Knights Commander of the Royal Victorian Order
Conservative Party (UK) Baronesses- and Lords-in-Waiting
Deputy Lieutenants of Down